The Zimbabwe national cricket team toured Australia in the 1994-95 season and played two first-class matches versus Tasmania and Queensland.

The tour consisted mainly of limited overs matches including the Benson and Hedges World Series Cup which also involved Australia and England.

Zimbabwe was captained by Andy Flower and the team included his brother Grant Flower and well-known players such as Heath Streak, Eddo Brandes, David Houghton and Paul Strang.

External sources
CricketArchive

References
 Playfair Cricket Annual
 Wisden Cricketers Almanack

1994 in Australian cricket
1994 in Zimbabwean cricket
1994–95 Australian cricket season
1995 in Australian cricket
1995 in Zimbabwean cricket
International cricket competitions from 1994–95 to 1997
1994-95